William Gibson Campbell (born 2 July 1944) is a former professional footballer, who played for Sunderland, Dundee, Motherwell, Hamilton Academical and Northern Ireland. He was also the player/manager of Linfield.

References

1944 births
Living people
Association footballers from Belfast
Association footballers from Northern Ireland
Association football wingers
Northern Ireland international footballers
Lisburn Distillery F.C. players
Sunderland A.F.C. players
Dundee F.C. players
Motherwell F.C. players
Linfield F.C. players
Hamilton Academical F.C. players
Lossiemouth F.C. players
English Football League players
Scottish Football League players
Football managers from Northern Ireland
Linfield F.C. managers
Northern Ireland amateur international footballers